Georgios Petmezas (22 March 1915 – 1999) was a Greek wrestler. He competed at the 1948 Summer Olympics and the 1952 Summer Olympics.

References

1915 births
1999 deaths
Greek male sport wrestlers
Olympic wrestlers of Greece
Wrestlers at the 1948 Summer Olympics
Wrestlers at the 1952 Summer Olympics
Place of birth missing